Lorence is a given name and a surname. People so named include:

 Lorence G. Collins, American petrologist
 Lorence Wenke, American politician
 Paul F. Lorence, United States Air Force Captain
 Edna Sirius Lorence, Australian politician

See also 
 Charles de Lorencez, French Army general
 Lorance (disambiguation)
 Loren
 Lorenc